Mason Cook (born July 25, 2000) is an American actor. He played Cecil Wilson in the 2011 film Spy Kids: All the Time in the World. From 2016 to 2019 he portrayed Ray DiMeo in the ABC sitcom Speechless.

Early life
Cook is from Oklahoma City. He attended Nichols Hills Elementary School. He enjoys BMX-biking and skateboarding. He has three siblings: Lilly, Lane and Georgia.

Career
Cook's first professional work was on television, on the sitcom According to Jim and the drama Grey's Anatomy.

When Cook was 11, he portrayed the role of Cecil Wilson in Spy Kids: All the Time in the World. For this, he was nominated for the Young Artist Award for Best Performance in a Feature Film – Supporting Young Actor in 2011. He also performed the minor recurring character Corey on the sitcom The Middle for several years. In 2016, he was cast as Ray DiMeo in ABC sitcom Speechless.

Filmography

References

External links
 

21st-century American male actors
American male child actors
American male film actors
Place of birth missing (living people)
American male television actors
American male voice actors
Living people
2000 births